With the advent of heavier-than-air flight, the aircraft carrier has become a decisive weapon at sea. In 1911 aircraft began to be successfully launched and landed on ships with the successful flight of a Curtiss Pusher aboard . The British Royal Navy pioneered the first aircraft carrier with floatplanes, as flying boats under performed compared to traditional land based aircraft. The greatest loss of life was the 2,046 killed on —a converted passenger liner with a small flight deck, carrying the Imperial Japanese Army's 64th Infantry Regiment.

Brazil

France

Germany

Italy

Japan

United Kingdom

United States

See also
 List of sunken battleships
 List of sunken battlecruisers
 List of sunken nuclear submarines
 List of aircraft carriers
 Timeline for aircraft carrier service
 List of aircraft carriers by country

Footnotes

References

External links 
 British escort carriers in WW2
 German carrier "Graf Zeppelin"
 Italian carriers in WW2 
 Japanese carriers in WW2
 US carriers in WW2

Sunken
Aircraft carriers